Neslihan Şenocak (born in İzmir, c. 1976) is a Turkish historian, and instructor at Bilkent University, Ankara and at Columbia University in the city of New York.

Career
Her work examines medieval religious orders and the daily life in the thirteenth-century Italy, and her most recent project is on the relationship of violent crimes and urbanization in 13th-century Perugia.

She is the author of several articles, as well as numerous book reviews. These works have been cited about 90 times in the academic literature.

Selected works

Articles
"Circulation of Books in the Medieval Franciscan Order: Attitude, Methods, and Critics" in the  Journal of Religious History, 2004,
"Book Acquisition in the Medieval Franciscan Order",  Journal of Religious History, 2003,
"The Franciscan Order and Natural Philosophy in the Thirteenth Century: A Relationship Redefined" in Journal for the Study of Religion, Nature and Culture, (Ecotheology 7.2) January 2003,
"Early Fourteenth-Century Franciscan Library Catalogues" in Scriptorium, Vol. 59, Nº. 1, 2005, pags. 29-50,

References

1976 births
Living people
Academic staff of Bilkent University
Turkish women historians
Columbia University faculty
21st-century Turkish historians
People from İzmir